Hartington railway station opened in 1899 about two miles away from the village it served -  Hartington  in Derbyshire, south east of Buxton.

It was on the Ashbourne Line built by the LNWR as a branch from the Cromford and High Peak Railway (which ran from Whaley Bridge to Cromford) at Parsley Hay.

To the north of the station is Hand Dale viaduct. It was reported that when digging the foundations for the piers, remains of a lead mine, in which the miners had perished, were discovered.

Platforms and buildings at this station, like the others on this line, were made of timber. From Parsley Hay to Ashbourne, the line was single with passing loops at the stations, but provision was made for doubling, which never occurred.

Like all the stations on the line, it was popular with ramblers, and had both a ladies' and a general waiting room, with a booking office. However, its distance from the village meant that when bus services began, it lost much of its local trade. Like the other intermediate station it had no footbridge so passengers arriving at the entrance and requiring the down platform had to walk to the end and use the barrow crossing. Water for both the station and the nearby Hartington Quarry was brought by rail using a tender.

Regular passenger services ended in 1954, but excursions continued until 1963. Freight continued until October of that year, the track to Ashbourne finally being lifted in 1964.

The track bed from Ashbourne to Parsley Hay was acquired by Derbyshire County Council in 1968 and the Peak National Park for a cycle and walking route. This, the Tissington Trail, was one of the first of such ventures in the country. Later, Ashbourne Tunnel was acquired by Sustrans.

The station buildings were demolished after closure but the typical LNWR signal box has been preserved as a visitor centre.

Today, this is also an alternative southern starting point of the Pennine Bridleway, joining the main trail at nearby Parsley Hay.

Route

See also
 Cromford and High Peak Railway

References

External links
 Tissington & High Peak Trails - access and facilities
 The Pennine Bridleway
 Hartington station on navigable 1946 O. S. map

Disused railway stations in Derbyshire
Peak District
Railway stations in Great Britain opened in 1899
Railway stations in Great Britain closed in 1963
Former London and North Western Railway stations